The Bulgarian girls’ high school of Thessaloniki "Sveto Blagoveshtenie" (Annunciation of Our Lady) was founded by the Bulgarian community there. The school had its own building and boarding house, acquired with the help of the Bulgarian benefactor Evlogi Georgiev. The idea of founding a school in Thessaloniki itself belonged to a well-known activist of the Bulgarian national revival Kuzman Shapkarev. The high school was founded in the autumn of 1880 in then Ottoman city of Thessaloniki, where it existed until 1913. The high school was maintained by the Bulgarian Exarchate and the Thessalonikian Bulgarian Municipality. Dimitar Miladinov's daughter, Tsarevna Miladinova, who was working as a teacher in Svishtov at the time, was invited as the first teacher. Kuzman Shapkarev had been appointed a head teacher of both the boys 'and girls' high schools in the city. Teachers from the Thessaloniki Bulgarian Men' High School, taught also there. Until its closure by the new Greek authorities in 1913, the high school prepared 22 outputs with a total of 647 graduates. Subsequently, the girls' school and the Bulgarian Men's High School of Thessaloniki merged into one school. Among the directors of the high school were Georgi Kandilarov, Marin Pundev, Hristo Batandzhiev, Mihail Sarafov (1895 - 1896), Yordan Nikolov (1910 - 1911) etc. The high school taught the same curriculum as the men's high school. After 1913 it moved successively to the towns of Strumica, Shtip, again Strumica, then Petrich. In 1920 it finally was placed in the town of Gorna Dzhumaya (today Blagoevgrad) in Pirin Macedonia, Bulgaria, where it still exists today under the name of the National Humanitarian High School "St. St. Cyril and Methodius".

See also
 Bulgarian Men's High School of Adrianople
 Education in the Ottoman Empire
 Bulgarian High School of Bolgrad

External links
 Thessaloniki and the Bulgarians

Notes 

Ottoman Thessalonica
Defunct schools in Greece
Educational institutions established in 1880
Educational institutions disestablished in 1913
Macedonia under the Ottoman Empire
Salonica vilayet
1880 establishments in the Ottoman Empire
Education in the Ottoman Empire
Bulgarian Girls' High School of Thessaloniki